The 2002 AFL Women's National Championships took place in Sydney, New South Wales, Australia. The tournament began on 29 June and ended on the  4 July 2002. The 2002 tournament was the eleventh Championship. The Senior-vics of Victoria won the 2002 Championship, defeating the Australian Capital Territory in the final. It was Victoria's 11th consecutive title.

Ladder
  Victoria-Senior
  Australian Capital Territory
  Western Australia
  Queensland
  Northern Territory
  South Australia
  New South Wales

External links
National Results from the AFL site

2002
2002 in Australian rules football
AFL